This is a list of the number-one songs of 2020 in Panama. The charts are published by Monitor Latino, based on airplay across radio stations in Panama using the Radio Tracking Data, LLC in real time. The chart week runs from Monday to Sunday.

In 2020, eleven singles reached number one in Panama; a twelfth single, "Ya No Más" by Nacho, Joey Montana and Yandel featuring Sebastián Yatra, began its run at number one in December 2019. Of those eleven number-one singles, fourteen acts topped the chart as either lead or featured artists, with nine—Karol G, Nicki Minaj, Carlos Vives, Myke Towers, CNCO, Greeicy, Cali y El Dandee, Wisin and The Weeknd—achieving their first number-one single in Panama.

"Tusa" by Karol G and Nicki Minaj was the longest-running number-one of the year, and later ranked as the best-performing single of 2020 in Panama, leading the chart for fourteen consecutive weeks, tying with "Con Calma" by Daddy Yankee featuring Snow (2018) as the fourth longest-running number-one song in Panama.

Carlos Vives is the only act to have multiple number-one songs in 2020, with three apiece.

Chart history

References 

Panamanian music-related lists
Panama
2020 in Panama
Panama 2020